Wartburg is a small town located  north-east of Pietermaritzburg and  south of Greytown in the uMshwathi Local Municipality of KwaZulu-Natal, South Africa.

The town was named after Wartburg castle in Thuringia where Martin Luther translated the Bible into German by the immigrant families who arrived in South Africa in 1848. A noticeable population of German-speaking citizens still live in the area surrounding the town.

The town is mostly supported by the surrounding agricultural industry, mostly sugar cane and timber production.

There are two schools that serve the town: Wartburg Kirchdorf School and Georgenau School, which originally was the Wartburg Kirchdorf Junior School.  The Wartburg Kirchdorf School caters to students from pre-school right through till grade 12.  The School has a wealth of facilities, having rugby fields, cricket fields, hockey fields, cricket nets, tennis courts, a swimming pool, and an athletics track and equipment, and a library.

References

External links 

Wartburg Kirchdorf School Official Website

Populated places in the uMshwathi Local Municipality
German settlements in South Africa